"Straight from the Heart" is a song recorded by Canadian rock musician Bryan Adams. It was released in February 1983 as the lead single from his third studio album, Cuts Like a Knife.

Background
The song was written by Eric Kagna, a Vancouver singer/songwriter, and the instrumental bridge was contributed by Adams. The official songwriter credit is shared equally between Adams and Kagna.  Adams did not release his version of the song until 1983. The song was first recorded by Ian Lloyd in 1980, on his album Third Wave Civilization.

Chart history
It was his breakthrough song in the U.S., the first to make the top 40, reaching number 10. It also peaked at #32 on the Adult Contemporary chart, the first Bryan Adams single to appear on that chart.  On the Canadian Adult Contemporary chart, "Straight from the Heart" reached number one.

Other versions
Australian singer Jon English recorded the song for his 1981 album, In Roads. The song peaked at number 72 in Australia.
Later, the song was covered by teen band Rosetta Stone in 1982 (issued as a single in November that year, two months before Adams' version was released on his album).  
Welsh singer Bonnie Tyler released it as a single on 11 August 1983, and it featured on her album Faster Than the Speed of Night.

References

External links
 
 

1980 songs
1981 singles
1982 singles
1983 singles
Bryan Adams songs
Jon English songs
Bonnie Tyler songs
Song recordings produced by Bob Clearmountain
Songs written by Bryan Adams
1980s ballads
Rock ballads
A&M Records singles